Paul Bayning  may refer to:

Paul Bayning, 1st Viscount Bayning (1588–1629), Viscount Bayning
Paul Bayning, 2nd Viscount Bayning (1616–1638), Viscount Bayning

See also
Bayning (surname)